Super City may refer to:

 Megalopolis or Supercity, a chain of roughly adjacent metropolitan areas.
 Super City, a 2016 video game by Mat Dickie
 Super City Rangers, a New Zealand basketball team
 Super City (store), a Mexican chain of convenience stores
 'Super City', the byname of the new amalgamated Auckland Council of Auckland, New Zealand
 Super City (toy), a toy similar to Lego produced by Ideal Toys in 1967
 Super City (TV series), a comedy series directed by Taika Waititi and starring Madeleine Sami
 Supercity (American Band), a small time band from Baltimore
 ČD Supercity Pendolino, a train service in the Czech Republic and Slovakia